Planet of Fire is the fifth serial of the 21st season in the British science fiction television series Doctor Who, which was first broadcast in four twice-weekly parts on BBC1 from 23 February to 2 March 1984.

In the serial, the Doctor's old enemy, the renegade Time Lord the Master (Anthony Ainley), plots to use the volcanic gases on the planet Sarn to renew his body after accidentally shrinking himself in an experiment.

Peter Davison's penultimate serial as the Doctor, it marks the departure of Mark Strickson as Vislor Turlough (who makes a brief reappearance in a dream sequence at the end of Davison's final story) and introduces Nicola Bryant as Peri Brown. It is also the second and final appearance of the shapeshifting robot Kamelion, who is played at various points throughout the serial by Gerald Flood, Dallas Adams, and Ainley.

Plot

On the desert world of Sarn, robed natives worship the fire god Logar and follow the Chief Elder, Timanov, who demands obedience. Dissenters are known as Unbelievers and two of them, Amyand and Roskal, cause unrest when they claim to have ventured to the top of the sacred fire mountain but not found Logar. One of the Sarns, Malkon, is known as the Chosen One because of the unusual double triangle symbol burnt into his skin: he is also unusual for having been found as a baby on the slopes of the sacred fire mountain.

The same triangle symbol is found on a metal artefact uncovered in an archaeological dig in Lanzarote overseen by Professor Howard Foster. His stepdaughter Peri Brown is bored with the dig and wants to go travelling in Morocco and when he seeks to prevent this she steals the strange artefact and tries to swim for freedom. Fortunately for her the TARDIS has landed nearby—responding to a distress call sent by the strange artefact—and Turlough sees her drowning and rescues her. Going through her possessions as she recovers he finds the artefact and acknowledges the same triangle symbol is burnt into his own flesh. The Fifth Doctor returns to the TARDIS after attempting to find the source of the signal emitted by the artefact, and the ship dematerialises, seemingly on its own. It arrives on Sarn and the Doctor and Turlough set off to explore.

The android Kamelion has meanwhile made mental contact with its old controller, the Master, who attempts to assert his control and change Kamelion's appearance from that of Howard. Kamelion tries to warn Peri of the Master but the Master succeeds in gaining control. She flees the TARDIS with the creature in pursuit as the rumblings of the volcanoes of Sarn gather ferocity.

In the Sarn colony Timanov has damned the Unbelievers to be sacrificed to appease Logar and stop the tremors. They flee to a secret base in the mountains filled with seismological apparatus, which the Doctor and Turlough stumble across. The Doctor informs the Unbelievers that the tunnels, which have been their refuge, are volcanic vents which will soon fill with molten lava. It is also established that Turlough is of the same race as those who colonised the planet, and when the indigenous people see his Misos Triangle, they greet him as a second Chosen One. Turlough realises Malkon may be his brother and becomes even more worried when Peri turns up and mentions the Master.

Another important figure in Sarn mythology is the Outsider, a promised prophet, and Kamelion, controlled by the Master, fulfils this role admirably. He convinces Timanov of the appropriateness of harsh action and when the Doctor arrives with the Unbelievers they are all seized for burning. However, Malkon and Peri arrive shortly afterwards and stop this, though not before Malkon has been injured. Turlough is aghast when he finds his relative has been shot and the Doctor presses him for as much information as he has on the strange circumstances of Sarn. It seems it is a long abandoned Trion colony planet, and that Turlough, a Trion, suspects some of his family were sent here after a revolution against the hereditary leading clans of his homeworld. He supposes his father died in a crash but that Malkon survived, while he himself was sent in exile to Earth, overseen by a Trion agent masquerading as a solicitor in Chancery Lane.

Kamelion has meanwhile seized Peri and uses her to transport a black box into the control room of his TARDIS. It contains a miniaturised Master—the real thing—who has been transformed by a disastrous experiment with his trademark Tissue Compression Eliminator (TCE) weapon. The Master thus re-established the psychic link with Kamelion to gain the power of movement and has manoeuvred the robot to Sarn so that he can take advantage of the restorative powers of the numismaton gas within the fire mountain.

Turlough realises the imminent volcanic bursts will destroy Sarn, so he uses a communication unit to get in touch with Trion and plead for a rescue ship to evacuate the planet. Acting on a message from the Doctor, Turlough programs the TARDIS to rescue the Doctor and Peri from the gas control room, forgoing a chance to stay aboard and escape from the military arriving from his homeworld. He finds out that a general amnesty has been issued and he is free to return home. Only the elders choose to remain on the planet to die, facing the erupting volcanoes, Timanov retaining his faith even in the face of Amyand's revelation that Logar was merely a man in a fireproof suit: "Another deception!"

The Doctor succeeds in weakening the Master's hold over Kamelion and interrupts the numismaton experiment. He adds calorific gas to the surge but is unable to prevent the Master from reacquiring his usual size and becoming—he taunts—"a thousand times stronger". As the gas flow alters, the Master is trapped and the Doctor watches as he is seemingly immolated. Implored by the terminally wounded Kamelion, the Doctor has put the automaton out of its misery using the TCE.  Escaping the destruction of the gas control room in the TARDIS along with Peri, the Doctor lands to pick up Turlough, only to find that he has elected to return to Trion. Turlough tells Peri to look after the Doctor. He then parts from the Doctor, thanking him for all that he has learned in his travels with him. As the Doctor and Peri return to the TARDIS, she says she has a few months' vacation left and would like to spend it travelling with him. The Doctor accepts and they depart.

Production

Costumes

It was decided that because of the climate of Lanzarote, where the serial was filmed, the cast would have to alter their usual costumes. Although Peter Davison started the story wearing his cricketer outfit, for the rest of the story, he wore a different pair of trousers with question mark braces and a beige floral waistcoat. Strickson shed his usual school uniform in favour of a blue pin-stripe shirt and tan shorts with a pair of swimming briefs underneath. Nicola Bryant also wore a pink bikini beneath her clothes to which she stripped down for a couple of scenes.

Cast notes

Mark Strickson has also reprised the role of Turlough in the audio plays by Big Finish Productions and penned the introduction to the spin-off novel Turlough and the Earthlink Dilemma (1986). Promotional photographs taken during production include a shot of Peter Davison wearing a tuxedo and holding a gun, with Nicola Bryant standing next to him in a bikini, in the style of James Bond. Eleanor Bron was originally considered for the role of Sorasta.

This serial was originally intended as the swan song for Anthony Ainley as the Master since his contract with the show had come to an end, hence the "death" of the character in the numismaton flames at the story's climax. As a deliberate tease for the audience, the Master's truncated final line is "Won't you even show mercy to your own...", with him apparently being killed by the gas just as he is about to reveal the true nature of his relationship to the Doctor. However, the Master reappeared in the following season's The Mark of the Rani without explanation as to how he survived the flames. Script Editor Eric Saward cut from The Mark of the Rani the explanation for the Master's survival provided by writers Pip and Jane Baker but the explanation is in their novelisation of the serial.

Broadcast and reception

Writing for Radio Times, Patrick Mulkern gave the serial three stars out of five and observed that writer Peter Grimwade "laces his script with homosexual subtext", noting in particular the "male eye candy on display", arguing that "old sage Timanov’s mentoring of callow youth Malkon has a hint of pederasty" and also commenting on the "unmistakably phallic object" hauled from the seabed and fondled by Howard, Curt and Peri. Paul Cornell, Martin Day and Keith Topping, authors of The Discontinuity Guide, thought that new companion Peri made a good impression, helped by some decent lines.  They said "As a whole the story is less than the sum of its parts: not a great deal happens, but it is competently written, and the location filming is excellent."

The serial was also positively reviewed by Arnold T Blumberg of IGN who said it had "a lot to recommend" with "beautiful location work" and effective sets. Blumberg also praised the performances of Anthony Ainley who was "far more menancing" as the Master than he had been previously, and Peter Wyngarde, an "excellent choice" for the role of a religious leader.

Commercial releases

In print

A novelisation of this serial, written by Peter Grimwade, was published by Target Books in October 1984. A prologue juxtaposing the crash of the vessel Professor Foster is salvaging with the crash of the Trion ship carrying Turlough's family to Sarn opens the novelisation. The Master's teasing last line "Won't you save your own..." is removed.

Home media
Planet of Fire was released on VHS in September 1998. The DVD was released in June 2010, with commentary by Peter Davison, Nicola Bryant, Mark Strickson and Fiona Cumming, as part of the box set Kamelion Tales along with The King's Demons.  It also contained a Special Edition edit of the story overseen by director Fiona Cumming. The special edition edit also included a specially filmed prequel before the opening titles. At a mere 66 minutes it is the shortest and the most edited of the special editions.
This serial was also released as part of the Doctor Who DVD Files in Issue 116 on 12 June 2013.

References

External links

Target novelisation

Doctor Who serials novelised by Peter Grimwade
Fifth Doctor serials
The Master (Doctor Who) television stories
1984 British television episodes
Fiction set in 1984
Television episodes set in Spain
Television shows set in the Canary Islands
Lanzarote in fiction